Shah Rukh Khan is an Indian actor, producer and television personality. Referred to in the media as "Baadshah of Bollywood", "King of Bollywood" or "King Khan", he has appeared in over 80 Bollywood films in genres including romance, action and comedy. He has a significant following in Asia and the Indian diaspora worldwide. His work in Bollywood has earned him numerous accolades, including 14 Filmfare Awards from 30 nominations.

Khan is currently co-chairman of the motion picture production company Red Chillies Entertainment and its subsidiaries, and is the co-owner of the Indian Premier League cricket team Kolkata Knight Riders. In 2007, he made his debut as a television presenter with the Star Plus game show Kaun Banega Crorepati.  The media often label him as "Brand SRK" because of his brand endorsement and entrepreneurship ventures. Khan's philanthropic endeavours have provided health care and disaster relief, and he was honoured with UNESCO's Pyramide con Marni award in 2011 for his support of children's education. He regularly features in listings of the most influential people in Indian culture, and in 2008 Newsweek named him one of their 50 most powerful people in the world.

Popularity and wealth 
Khan is considered one of the biggest film stars in the world and is referred to by the media as "King Khan", "The Baadshah of Bollywood", and "The King of Bollywood". In 2008, Newsweek named him one of their 50 most powerful people in the world and called him "the world's biggest movie star". In 2011, Steven Zeitchik of the Los Angeles Times said, "He is the biggest movie star you've never heard of. And perhaps the world's biggest movie star, period." His popularity in India has been attributed to his emergence during the liberalisation and changing economic scenario of the 1990s, when he was able to personify a new India. His popularity reaches beyond India as well; from 1989 through 2003, he starred in seven of the top ten Hindi films in the UK.

Khan is the object of a sometimes fanatical following. On streets of India, posters of him were sold next to those of religious deities, and shrines have been built in his honour. Fans have changed their name to match his, sent him letters written in blood, and wait outside his home hoping for a sighting. In August 2009 Khan was detained at the Newark, New Jersey airport when a name similar to his "popped up on the computer". When he was taken to a room for questioning, some officers and other detainees recognised him and asked for autographs.

Khan is one of the wealthiest and most powerful celebrities in India. In 2013, according to the Hurun Report, Khan was placed in the 114th position on a list of the wealthiest Indians, with personal assets of over $400 million. In 2014, the firm Wealth-X ranked Khan second in their listing of the richest actors in the world (behind only Jerry Seinfeld), with an estimated net worth of $600 million. Khan was the only Bollywood actor to feature in the list. Khan was placed at number one on Box Office India's list of top actors for the first time in 1994, and repeated the feat in 1995 and 1998, and from 2002 to 2008. For his work in the 2000s, Khan was considered one of the ten "Most Powerful Entertainers of the Decade" by FICCI. Khan was placed first on Forbes India's "Celebrity 100 list", a list based on the income and popularity of Indian celebrities, for 2012 and 2013. Khan owns several properties in India and abroad. Mannat, his residence in Mumbai, is a tourist spot and a heritage building deemed important to the townscape and hence exempt from demolition. Khan owns a house in New Delhi, a  apartment in London, and a villa on the Palm Jumeirah in Dubai worth .

Public image 

Khan was given the birth name Shahrukh Khan, but he prefers his name to be written as Shah Rukh Khan, and is commonly referred to by the abbreviation SRK. He is well known for his devotion to his work and his ability to commit heavily to each role. Director Aziz Mirza describes Khan as a natural actor who has "a rawness in him" and "a crowd appeal, even when he was just with friends". Despite the adulation, Khan has often been criticised for his lack of subtlety in performing roles. In the book Everybody Wants a Hit: 10 Mantras of Success in Bollywood Cinema, author Derek Bose wrote, "The joke going around then was that Shahrukh Khan had no more than five expressions to play about with and by cleverly juggling them in film after film, made his mark as a superstar". Rival actors have been known to publicly accuse him of overacting.

Khan's perceived typecasting in romantic roles has met with polarised reactions from commentators; the author Arnab Ray wrote that Khan "became trapped in the conventional romantic lover-boy image, continuing to essay, over the years, a series of roles that were mind-numbingly alike". Aseem Chhabra of Rediff.com said he "plays the romantic man with such pizzazz and in the old-world style that he is treat to watch, as he woos the hearts of his co-stars and his audience!"

Khan's non-macho persona, and close ties with director Karan Johar, have led to persistent media rumours about his sexuality, which has made for a rocky relationship with fan magazines. Regardless, the media has bestowed many honours on Khan, and he is one of the most celebrated film stars in India. In April 2012, Khan was served a notice by the Rajasthan Police for smoking in public after he was seen smoking on camera during a match between KKR and the Rajasthan Royals.

A 2007 poll by the magazine Eastern Eye named Khan the sexiest Asian man; he was ranked third in the same magazine's polls in 2008 and 2011. He has regularly featured among the top ten on The Times of Indias list of the 50 most desirable men in India. Media have said his dimples are one of his distinctive physical features. Khan has also achieved recognition as a style icon in India. In 2011, the British edition of GQ magazine featured him as one of the best dressed men in the world. The following year, the Indian edition of GQ included Khan in their listing of Bollywood's 11 best dressed men. In 2009, he modelled at both the Lakme Fashion Week and the India Couture Fashion Week.

In 2015, Khan has received a privileged degree from the University of Edinburgh, Scotland. He received the level of Doctor Honoris Causa from the University Chancellor the Princess Royal in Edinburgh.

Endorsements

Khan is often labelled as "Brand SRK" by media organisations because of his brand endorsement and entrepreneurship ventures. Celebrity endorsements in India began in the late 1980s. Khan's first advertising venture was with Liberty Shoes in 1988.  He also worked for Brahmaputra Tea in 1993. From 1999, Khan's career in television advertising increased significantly. He is one of the highest paid Bollywood endorsers and one of the most visible celebrities in television advertising, with up to a 6 per cent share of the television advertisement market. A survey conducted by AdEx India ranked him first on the list of high profile brand ambassadors for 2008, a year in which Khan endorsed 39 brandsthe most of all Indian celebrities on television. In 2007, Anupama Chopra stated that Khan was an "ever present celebrity", with two or three films a year, constantly running television ads, print ads, and gigantic billboards lining the streets of Indian cities.

Khan has endorsed prominent brands including LML, Pepsi, Nokia, Hyundai, Dish TV, D'decor, LUX and TAG Heuer. He has been named "Brand Ambassador of the Year" at various business awards ceremonies. In 2005, Khan launched his own perfume called "Tiger Eyes by SRK", which is manufactured by the French perfume brand Jeanne Arthes. Khan has also been engaged as a brand ambassador to represent sport leagues, resorts and Indian states. He represented Force India, the Formula One racing team representing India in international motor race championships in 2007, the live entertainment theatre and leisure destination Kingdom of Dreams in 2010, the Champions League Twenty20 annual international cricket competition in 2011, the state of West Bengal in 2011, and film complex Prayag Film City in Chandrakona, West Bengal in 2012.

In 2012, The Times of India speculated that Khan's brand value had declined because of his status as an ageing superstar. They cited that Pepsi had replaced him with the younger star Ranbir Kapoor in 2009, among other reasons. In 2013, however, he was still among the top celebrity endorsers. The Indian edition of Forbes named him "Shah Rukh Inc" and declared him India's biggest brand. In 2014, The Times of India reported that Khan had doubled his fee for promoting a pan masala brand after learning they had first approached another actor. At , this was one of the most lucrative deals for a Bollywood actor ever.

Since 2015, Khan is endorsing online grocery brand BigBasket.

In 2016, Department of Tourism and Commerce Marketing (Dubai Tourism) collaborated with Khan for a year-long campaign aimed to appeal to his fans across the globe, giving them the opportunity to explore the city of Dubai and its many offerings.

Humanitarian causes 

Khan has been brand ambassador of various governmental campaigns, including Pulse Polio and National AIDS Control Organisation. He is a member of the board of directors of Make-A-Wish Foundation in India, and in 2011 he was appointed by the UNOPS as the first global ambassador of the Water Supply and Sanitation Collaborative Council. Khan told The Guardian that he tries to keep his charity work guarded because of his religious beliefs. In 2009, when news broke that Khan had committed to bear all expenses for the treatment of two Kashmiri orphan children who suffered severe burns during a terrorist attack in Srinagar, it was revealed that he had been anonymously donating to Nanavati Hospital in Vile Parle for nine years.

Khan has performed in charity and benefit concerts including the Help Telethon Concert to raise money for the victims of the 2004 Indian Ocean earthquake. He, together with Rani Mukerji and director Karan Johar donated  to the Prime Minister Manmohan Singh's Tsunami Relief Fund for the tsunami-affected areas in India. Khan organised and participated in the Temptations 2005 show in New Delhi, which raised funds for the disabled rights group National Centre For Promotional of Employment for Disabled People.

Khan has pledged to further the cause of child education in India. He has recorded a series of public service announcements championing good health, child immunisation and proper nutrition, and joined India's Health Ministry and UNICEF in a nationwide child immunisation campaign as part of National Rural Health Mission of India. In 2011, he joined Amitabh Bachchan and Judi Dench to promote Resul Pookutty's foundation that works to improve the living conditions of underprivileged people in India. The same year, he received UNESCO's Pyramide con Marni award for his charitable commitment to provide education for children, becoming the first Indian to win the accolade. During his multiple appearances at the NDTV Greenathon, Khan has adopted up to twelve villages to provide with electricity as part of the solar energy harnessing project's initiative Light A Billion Lives.

Khan is the founder of the non‐profit Meer Foundation, which provides support to female victims of acid attacks and major burn injuries through medical treatment, legal aid, vocational training, rehabilitation and livelihood support. He has also been responsible for the creation of specialized children's hospital wards and has supported childcare centres with free boarding for children undergoing cancer treatment. For the same causes, he was honored at the 24th Annual Crystal Awards ceremony which was held on 22 January 2018, launching the World Economic Forum's 48th Annual Meeting.

In April 2020, Khan announced a series of initiatives to help the government of India and the state governments of Maharashtra, West Bengal and Delhi mitigate the COVID-19 pandemic and relief measures including providing meals, groceries and basic essentials for thousands of underprivileged people and daily wage laborers affected by the lockdown. Khan also offered his four-storied personal office space to Brihanmumbai Municipal Corporation to be utilised as quarantine facility.

In other media 

Khan's popularity has been documented in several Indian and international non-fiction films. In 2005, Nasreen Munni Kabir produced and directed a two-part documentary titled The Inner and Outer World of Shah Rukh Khan. The film featured the Temptations 2004 concert tour and contrasted Khan's inner world of family and daily life with the outer world of his work. Khan has also been the subject of the Danish film Larger Than Life (2003) and the German film Shah Rukh Khan: In Love with Germany (2008). In 2010, the Discovery Travel & Living channel produced a ten-part miniseries titled Living with a SuperstarShah Rukh Khan. The same year, Discovery Channel aired a television special titled Revealed: Shah Rukh Khan, in which social anthropologists, filmmakers, scholars, critics and lifestyle commentators analysed the impact of Khan's image in India and abroad. The actor-director Makarand Deshpande directed a feature film named Shahrukh Bola "Khoobsurat Hai Tu" (2010), which centres around an obsessive female fan of Khan.

In 2016, Khan was on the Hindi commentary team of StarSports on 23 March 2016 India vs Bangladesh match of the ICC World T20 2016 in India. Khan was on air for the first 30 minutes, during which he talked about importance of sports in society and for youth in India.

In 2005, Khan was the subject of 20 paintings by Indian artist Anjana Kuthiala. Greatly inspired by M.F. Husain's work with actress Madhuri Dixit, Kuthiala chose Khan to be the muse and subject of her collections. Khan and Priyanka Chopra, Kajol and Hrithik Roshan had their likenesses made into a series of miniature dolls for Hasbro and the UK-based Bollywood Legends Corporation. In 2007, Khan became the third Indian actor to have his wax statue installed at London's Madame Tussauds museum, after Aishwarya Rai and Amitabh Bachchan. Additional versions of the statue were installed at Madam Tussauds' museums in Los Angeles, Hong Kong, New York and Washington.

Several books about Khan have been published: Still Reading Khan, by Mushtaq Shiekh describes Khan's family life and features rare photographs. The book was re-released in a second edition with the title Shah Rukh Can. Anupama Chopra published a biography of Khan titled King of Bollywood: Shah Rukh Khan and the Seductive World of Indian Cinema, set against the background of the Indian film industry. Deepa Gahlot published SRK: King Khan, which features an analysis of Khan's life and career. In 2012, Khan became the first Indian actor and the second Indian citizen after Sachin Tendulkar to have his biography, titled King Khan: The Official Opus of Shah Rukh Khan, published by Kraken Opus.

In December 2016, the Indian edition of GQ published a cover story about Khan called "The Khan Academy," a reference to Sal Khan's American non-profit, Khan Academy. In the article, Khan refers to social media as "that inappropriate family member you're always shushing because they're being plain offensive."

In April 2017, Khan delivered a speech at TED conference, becoming the first Bollywood personality to do so.

Notes

References

Bibliography 
 
 
 

Hindi cinema
Shah Rukh Khan